The 1938 Yellow River flood (literally "Huayuankou embankment breach incident") was a flood created by the Nationalist Government in central China during the early stage of the Second Sino-Japanese War in an attempt to halt the rapid advance of Japanese forces. It has been called the "largest act of environmental warfare in history" and an example of scorched earth military strategy. Hundreds of thousands of people were killed, and millions became refugees.

Strategic decision and subsequent flood 

Following the onset of the Second Sino-Japanese War in 1937, the Imperial Japanese Army marched rapidly into the heart of Chinese territory. By June 1938, the Japanese had control of all of North China. On June 6, they captured Kaifeng, the capital of Henan, and threatened to take over Zhengzhou, the junction of the arterial Pinghan and Longhai Railways. Japanese success here would have directly endangered the major city of Wuhan.

To stop further Japanese advances into western and southern China, Chiang Kai-shek, at the suggestion of Chen Guofu, determined to open up the dikes (levees) on the Yellow River near Zhengzhou. The original plan was to destroy the dike of Zhaokou, but due to difficulties at that location, the dike of Huayuankou, on the Yellow River's south bank, was destroyed on June 5 and June 7 via tunneling, with waters flooding into Henan, Anhui, and Jiangsu. The floods covered and destroyed thousands of square kilometers of farmland, and shifted the course of the Yellow River hundreds of kilometers to the south. Thousands of villages were inundated, and several million villagers were forced from their homes and made refugees. An unknown number of Japanese soldiers were killed by the flood. An official Kuomintang-led postwar commission estimated that the total number of casualties may be as high as 800,000 killed by the flood.

After the flooding, the Yellow River was diverted from its earlier course at Huayuankou, and flowed into the Jialu River in Zhongmu County. The new course led the Yellow River into the Shaying River at the city of Zhoujiakou (now Zhoukou), eventually joining the Huai River. Water overflowed from these smaller rivers, causing widespread destruction in the basin. According to a postwar report, floods inundated 32 percent of land and 45 percent of villages in 20 affected counties.

Controversy regarding the strategy
The strategic value of the flood has been questioned. Japanese troops were out of its range, either to the north and east or to the south. Their advance on Zhengzhou was halted, but they took Wuhan in October by attacking from a different direction. The Japanese did not occupy much of Henan until late in the war, and their hold on Anhui and Jiangsu remained tenuous. Most of the flooded towns and transport lines had already been captured by the Japanese; after the flood, the Japanese could not consolidate their control over the area. In fact, large parts of it became guerrilla areas.

Controversy regarding number of casualties

The number of casualties in the flood remains disputed and estimates have been revised by the Chinese government and other researchers in the decades after the event. There is no way of accurately assessing the casualties: much of the population, including officials, had already fled, leaving no government control and no one to count the dead. In the shifting battles between bandits, Nationalists, Communists, and Japanese, counting casualties was not a high priority. The Nationalist government, after initially claiming that the breach was caused by Japanese bombing,  used the heavy casualties to demonstrate the scale of sacrifice required of the Chinese people; it claimed that 12 million people had been affected by the flood, and in 1948 it estimated the number of deaths, including hundreds of thousands of Japanese who perished during the flooding, at 800,000. A 1994 PRC (People's Republic of China) official history of the war put the dead in the flood at 900,000 and the number of refugees at nearly 10 million. Scholars exploring the archives now give much lower figures: 400,000–500,000 dead, 3 million refugees, and 5 million people affected (another estimate puts the number of dead at 500,000, and the number of homeless at 500,000).

Aftermath 

Besides the massive death toll, the flooded areas were affected for years to come. The flooded countryside was more or less abandoned and all the crops destroyed. Upon the recession of the waters, much of the ground was uncultivable as much of the soil was covered in silt. Many of the public structures and housing were also destroyed, leaving any survivors destitute. The irrigation channels were also ruined, further adding to the toll on the farmlands.
The destruction also had a long-term psychological effect on the Chinese population. Unable to fully decide which group deserved more blame for the catastrophe, the Chinese Government or the invading Japanese, many survivors blamed both sides. Believing that the civilians would help them, the Chinese Communists turned the flooded area into a recruiting ground, directing survivors' anger towards a common enemy to bring them into their ranks. By the 1940s the area had evolved into a major guerrilla base known as the Yuwansu Base Area.

Repairs 
Attempts to seal the breach and return the river to its former course were made in 1946 by the KMT with assistance from UNRRA. Work began in March and was completed in June, but the dams were again destroyed by large summer flows. Subsequent repairs succeeded and were eventually completed in March 1947.

See also 

 1938 Changsha Fire
 Chinese famine of 1942–43
 1941 eastern Ukraine floods during WW2
 Indian famine of 1943
 National Revolutionary Army
 Military of the Republic of China
 Military history of China
 Military history of Japan

Sources
 Diana Lary,  "The Waters Covered the Earth: China's War-Induced Natural Disaster,"  in Mark Selden and Alvin Y. So, ed., War and State Terrorism: The United States, Japan, and the Asia-Pacific in the Long Twentieth Century (Rowman & Littlefield, 2004): 143–170.
Di Wu, "The cult of geography: Chinese riverine defence during the Battle of Wuhan, 1937-1938". War in History. Volume: 29 issue: 1, page(s): 185-204.  https://doi.org/10.1177%2F0968344520961548

References

1938 Yellow River flood
Second Sino-Japanese War
1938 disasters in China
1938 floods in Asia
1938 in China
Mass murder in 1938
Man-made disasters in China
Floods in China
Disasters in Henan